The Gellibrand River is a perennial river of the Corangamite catchment, located in the Otways region of the Australian state of Victoria.

Location and features
The Gellibrand River rises in the Otway Ranges in southwest Victoria, near the locality of Upper Gellibrand in the Beech Forest. From its highest point, the river descends  over its  course.

In its upper reaches, the river is impounded by the West Gellibrand Dam.

Etymology
The river was named after Joseph Gellibrand, a solicitor and colonist from England. In 1844 George Allan, a pioneer pastoralist of the Allansford region, recovered what was widely regarded as the remains of Gellibrand near to the river and subsequently named it after him. Gellibrand had previously gone missing in the Otway region on an expedition in 1837.

The local Gadubanud name for the river was Barrat.

See also

References

External links

 

Corangamite catchment
Rivers of Barwon South West (region)
Otway Ranges